David Booth (born 2 October 1948) is an English football manager and former player.

Early years
Booth was brought up in Darton near Barnsley and attended Queen Elizabeth Grammar School, Wakefield where he played rugby and cricket. Football was not played at his school. Dave joined Barnsley and made his first team debut at 19 years of age at left back where he played most of his career. He was later signed by Laurie McMenemy, later of Southampton and the England coaching staff, who was then manager of Grimsby Town.

Managerial career

David Booth became manager of Grimsby Town in January 1982 with the club at the bottom of the Second Division, following the dismissal of George Kerr. A late upturn in form enabled Grimsby to escape relegation, and good form continued into the 1982–83 season with Grimsby as high as 4th after two-thirds of the season. However, failure to win their last 14 games meant that Grimsby only narrowly avoided relegation.

The 1983–84 season, however, would see Grimsby emerge as serious promotion contenders for the majority of the season. They were third in the table at the end of February 1984, but a late dip in form meant they finished in fifth place and ten points off the top three, but it was and remains their highest finish in the league since relegation from the First Division in 1948. Good form continued the following season with a tenth-place finish, and disposing Everton from the League Cup, but Booth resigned in November 1985 to participate in a property developing venture abroad, and was replaced by Mick Lyons.

He later managed Darlington but could not prevent relegation from the Third Division. The initial challenge for promotion was not sustained and the side was facing relegation from the League when Booth was sacked in February 1989. Following this he became Assistant Manager and latterly Caretaker Manager at Peterborough United after the sacking of Mark Lawrenson. He was sacked after a brief spell and some poor performances with Chris Turner becoming manager who earned successive promotions to the second division.

In 1991, Booth moved to Ghana  first coached at Obuasi Ashanti Gold and led them to the championship. He was recommended by Bobby Charlton when Charlton's company, BCI, worked as consultants for the Ashanti Goldfields Corporation who funded the football club. 'I had never been to Africa before I took a short-term contract at Obuasi and I treated it like an adventure,' said Booth. He signed up for four weeks and stayed for four years; moved on to Brunei, then moved back after Ghana after long time Asante Kotoko S.C. as a technical director.

He moved to India in 2003 to manage Mumbai-based club Mahindra United guiding them to win Federation Cup, Super Cup and the Mumbai Football League. But then there was an apparent falling out with Chairman Alan Durante, and he departed for South-East Asia.

In South East Asia, he was the coach of the Myanmar national football team in 2003 guiding them to the semi-finals of the 2003 SEA Games.
 
Upon returning to India with newly formed Mumbai FC to join his friends Henry Menezes and Arshad, he promoted the club from second division and ensured Mumbai FC as a mid-table I-League club. With the relative success of Booth, Menezes and Arshad, Mahindra United was quick to offer better contracts to the trio. with Booth signing a 3-year deal with Mahindra United starting from August 2009.

After his brief successful spell in India, he was appointed coach of Laos national football team from July 2010 till December 2010. He also had a small stint in Sisaket F.C. of Thai Premier League. He then moved to Phnom Penh Crown FC in the Cambodian League from 2011 to 2012 winning Cambodian League, also becoming runner's up in 2011 AFC President's Cup. He again returned to India and had a one-year stint at Salgaocar F.C. between 2012–13. After his unsuccessful return to India, he was again appointed as Laos national football team from August 2014.

On 1 November 2017, he was appointed as the head coach of I-League 2nd Division side Ozone. The club won 2017–18 Bangalore Super Division under his coaching.

Honours

As a manager
Grimsby Town
 Lincolnshire Senior Cup: 1983–84

Peterborough 
 Football League Third Division (Play-off Winners): 1991–92

Ashanti Gold
Ghana Premier League:1993–94

Mahindra United
Federation Cup: 2003
The Mumbai League: 2002–03

Mumbai
2008 I-League 2nd Division: 2007–08

Phnom Penh Crown
Cambodian League: 2011
2011 AFC President's Cup runner-up: 2011

Lao Toyota
Lao Premier League: 2015; runner-up 2014
Lao FF Cup runner-up: 2014

Ozone
Bangalore Super Division: 2017–18

Managerial stats

References

External links

Dave Booth - Post War English & Scottish Football League A - Z Player's Transfer Database

1948 births
Living people
English footballers
Association football fullbacks
Barnsley F.C. players
Grimsby Town F.C. players
English Football League players
English football managers
Grimsby Town F.C. managers
Darlington F.C. managers
Brunei national football team managers
Myanmar national football team managers
Grimsby Town F.C. non-playing staff
Dave Booth
Mumbai FC managers
Laos national football team managers
Dave Booth
Salgaocar FC managers
Lao Toyota F.C. players
Phnom Penh Crown FC managers
English Football League managers
I-League managers
Dave Booth
English expatriate football managers
English expatriate sportspeople in Brunei
English expatriate sportspeople in Myanmar
English expatriate sportspeople in Laos
English expatriate sportspeople in India
English expatriate sportspeople in Thailand
English expatriate sportspeople in the Maldives
English expatriate sportspeople in Cambodia
Expatriate football managers in Brunei
Expatriate football managers in Myanmar
Expatriate football managers in Laos
Expatriate football managers in India
Expatriate football managers in Thailand
Expatriate football managers in the Maldives
Expatriate football managers in Cambodia